Liverpool F.C. is a professional association football club based in Liverpool, England

Liverpool F.C. may also refer to:
 Liverpool L.F.C., a women's association football club in the FA Women's Super League
 Liverpool F.C. (Montevideo), a Uruguayan football club
A.F.C Liverpool an English football club in the North West Counties League
 Liverpool F.C. (Superleague Formula team), an auto racing team that competed in the Superleague Formula
 Liverpool St Helens F.C., a rugby union team